Gamuda Land is the property development arm of Gamuda Berhad,  an engineering, property and infrastructure company in Malaysia. Established in 1995, Gamuda Land has and is currently developing seven townships in Malaysia and also in Vietnam. The company’s main projects are integrated township developments.
Gamuda Land’s maiden township in Malaysia is Kota Kemuning, situated in Shah Alam.  Spanning , Kota Kemuning is famous for its  Central Lake and also the Kota Permai Golf and Country Club.
Gamuda Land went on to build three more township developments across the Klang Valley, one in Iskandar Puteri, Johor, one in Kuala Lumpur City Centre and its latest in Hanoi, Vietnam.

Developments 

Kota Kemuning, situated in Shah Alam, Selangor –  Established in 1994.
Bandar Botanic, situated in Klang, Selangor – ) Built in 2000.
Valencia, situated in Sungai Buloh, Selangor – ) It is established in 2002. This residential development has its own private golf course for its residents and became Malaysia’s first boutique golf development.
Horizon Hills, situated in Iskandar Puteri, Johor – ) Built in 2006. Horizon Hills is located in Iskandar Puteri, Iskandar Malaysia. It is built in the mixed development concept with its own 18 hole Par 72 championship golf course managed by Horizon Hills Golf & Country Club.
Jade Hills, situated in Kajang, Selangor – ) Gamuda Land acquired the freehold land in 2006 to create an innovative gated and guarded township with a modern contemporary oriental theme.
Madge Mansions, situated in Jalan Ampang, Kuala Lumpur – ) This plot of land was acquired in 2007 to develop 52 freehold condominium units adjacent to Taman U-Thant.

References

Property companies of Malaysia
1995 establishments in Malaysia
Real estate companies established in 1995
Privately held companies of Malaysia